Bound4LIFE is a grassroots anti-abortion organization originating in the United States. The non-profit organization was founded in 2004 by Lou Engle and Brian Kim when both men and a group of mostly young people gathered for silent prayer in front of the United States Supreme Court in Washington, DC. The key identifying element of the movement is a piece of red tape with the word "LIFE" handwritten on it that is worn over the mouth during prayer gatherings. "Taping their mouths shut" is a voluntary way of promoting prayer as opposed to vocal protest. In this context, prayer is described as an appeal to God as the Judge of heaven and earth. A major goal of the organization is to train and multiply the number of Christians that pray regularly for the ending of abortion.

Activism 

The organization encourages participants to make a three-part pledge. The first deals with praying daily for abortion to end; presumably for the 1973 Supreme Court decision Roe v. Wade to be overturned. The second part calls for participants to only vote for candidates that support a similar point of view concerning abortion. The final part calls for participants to "obey God in acts of compassion and justice." Sources state that over 320,000 participants have taken this pledge.

References are also made to promoting adoption as a legitimate alternative to abortion regardless of circumstances.

Bound4LIFE participants in the past have shown interest in and have attempted to directly and indirectly influence federal and state legislation through personal contact and voter mobilization.

Press 

In its 5-year anniversary issue, Relevant Magazine listed Lou Engle and the red "LIFE" tape as one of the top 35 ideas that have changed the world.

References 

Anti-abortion organizations in the United States
Christian organizations based in the United States